Turtleford is a town in the rural municipality of Mervin No. 499, in the Canadian province of Saskatchewan.   Turtleford is located on Highway 26 near the intersection / concurrency with Highway 3 and Highway 303. The nearest large communities are North Battleford and Lloydminster. The Turtle River runs through Turtleford, and nearby are Bright Sand Lake and Turtle Lake.

Turtleford boasts the nation's largest turtle statue (more than eight feet tall), named Ernie. "Ernie the Turtle" is located on Hwy 26 near the south edge of town.

A small vulnerable songbird called Sprague's pipit has a breeding range in the northern Great Plains of North America, and amongst their breeding spots is Turtleford, Saskatchewan.

History
First settled in 1907 and 1908 the town was named for its proximity to the early river crossing (or ford) on the Turtle River. A post office opened in 1913 and by 1914 the ongoing extension of a Canadian Northern Railway (CNoR) branch from North Battleford had reached Turtleford. By 1915 dozens of businesses had opened and Turtleford became a major centre for the area population.  

The North Battleford - Turtleford Branch of the CNoR (later merged into Canadian National Railway), which primarily serviced the grain elevators used by the farmers northwest of North Battleford, ceased operation by 2005, when the remaining elevators closed.  The branch had served Hamlin, Prince, Meota (1910 extension), Cavalier, Vawn, Edam, Mervin and Turtleford, and had been extended farther northwest to Cleeves, Spruce Lake, St. Walburg (1919 extension), with a fork to Paradise Hill and Frenchman Butte.  The rail line and Saskatchewan Highway 26 ran beside each other from Prince to St. Walburg.

Demographics 

Education
Turtleford (Turtleford Community School) belongs to Turtleford School Division #65 a part of Northwest School Division.
Turtleford is served by Lakeland Library Region - Turtleford Branch

Media
Turtleford is served by The Northwest News weekly newspaper.

Notable people 

 Eric B. Rosendahl, Member of the Legislative Assembly of Alberta for West Yellowhead, May 5, 2015 – March 19, 2019
 Alexander Keen, Teacher Fellow at University of Saskatchewan, 2014  Shad

References

External links

Towns in Saskatchewan
Mervin No. 499, Saskatchewan